Rasmus Erik Dahlin (born 13 April 2000) is a Swedish professional ice hockey defenceman and an alternate captain for the Buffalo Sabres of the National Hockey League (NHL). Having been referred to as the most talented player available in the 2018 NHL Entry Draft class, Dahlin was selected first overall in the draft by the Sabres.

Playing career
In the 2016–17 season, Dahlin scored his first Swedish Hockey League (SHL) goal with Frölunda HC on 12 November 2016 in a game against Karlskrona HK.

Leading up to the 2018 NHL Entry Draft, Dahlin was widely considered the top prospect. He was described as a smart two-way defenceman with a great set of tools, including skating, puck handling, vision, intelligence and shot. Dan Marr of the NHL Central Scouting Bureau described him as an exceptionally talented prospect that would be able to impact his team's fortune in a way similar to Erik Karlsson and Victor Hedman.

On 22 June 2018, Dahlin was drafted first overall by the Buffalo Sabres in the Draft. He was the first Swedish player to be drafted first overall since Mats Sundin in 1989, and the second Swede overall to accomplish the feat. On July 9, he signed a three-year, entry-level contract with the Sabres. Dahlin participated at the Sabres' training camp and made the opening night roster for the 2018–19 season. He made his NHL debut on October 4 in a 4–0 loss to the Boston Bruins. Dahlin recorded his first career NHL goal on October 13 in a 3–0 win over the Arizona Coyotes. On 9 February 2019, after a win over the Detroit Red Wings, Dahlin became the fifth defenceman in NHL history to record 30 points before age 19. Following his rookie season, Dahlin was named as one of the three finalists for the Calder Memorial Trophy as the top rookie in the NHL.

On 22 September 2021, Dahlin signed a three-year, $18 million contract with the Sabres. He enjoyed a breakout 2021–22 season, posting new career highs in goals, assists and points and was named to the 2022 National Hockey League All Star Game.

Dahlin opened the 2022–23 season by setting an NHL record for goals by a defenceman in consecutive opening games, at four, as part of a resurgent Sabres team. Dahlin was later named to his second consecutive All-Star Game, replacing injured teammate Tage Thompson.

International play
At age 16, Dahlin was the youngest player to ever dress for Sweden at the IIHF World U20 Championship, and the youngest player overall in the 2017 World Junior Ice Hockey Championships. Dahlin competed in the 2018 World Junior Ice Hockey Championships for Sweden, recording six assists and helping lead the team to win silver. He was named the tournament's top defenceman after scoring the second-most points amongst tournament defencemen. After Dahlin and several other teammates removed their silver medals after receiving them during the medal ceremony, he was suspended for the first two games of the 2019 World Junior Ice Hockey Championships.

Dahlin also represented the Swedish senior team at the 2018 Winter Olympics, becoming the youngest player to compete in the 2018 tournament, and the youngest to compete in the men's hockey tournament since 1984.

Career statistics

Regular season and playoffs

International

Awards and honors

References

External links
 

2000 births
Living people
Buffalo Sabres draft picks
Buffalo Sabres players
Frölunda HC players
Ice hockey players at the 2018 Winter Olympics
National Hockey League All-Stars
National Hockey League first-overall draft picks
National Hockey League first-round draft picks
Olympic ice hockey players of Sweden
People from Trollhättan
Sportspeople from Västra Götaland County
Swedish ice hockey defencemen